The Palearctic or Palaearctic is the largest of the eight biogeographic realms of the Earth. It stretches across all of Eurasia north of the foothills of the Himalayas, and North Africa.

The realm consists of several bioregions: the Euro-Siberian region; the Mediterranean Basin; the Sahara and Arabian Deserts; and Western, Central and East Asia. The Palaearctic realm also has numerous rivers and lakes, forming several freshwater ecoregions.

The term 'Palearctic' was first used in the 19th century, and is still in use as the basis for zoogeographic classification.

History

In an 1858 paper for the Proceedings of the Linnean Society, British zoologist Philip Sclater first identified six terrestrial zoogeographic realms of the world: Palaearctic, Aethiopian/Afrotropic, Indian/Indomalayan, Australasian, Nearctic, and Neotropical. The six indicated general groupings of fauna, based on shared biogeography and large-scale geographic barriers to migration.

Alfred Wallace adopted Sclater's scheme for his book The Geographical Distribution of Animals, published in 1876. This is the same scheme that persists today, with relatively minor revisions, and the addition of two more realms: Oceania and the Antarctic realm.

Major ecological regions

The Palearctic realm includes mostly boreal/subarctic-climate and temperate-climate ecoregions, which run across Eurasia from western Europe to the Bering Sea.

Euro-Siberian region

The boreal and temperate Euro-Siberian region is the Palearctic's largest biogeographic region, which transitions from tundra in the northern reaches of Russia and Scandinavia to the vast taiga, the boreal coniferous forests which run across the continent. South of the taiga are a belt of temperate broadleaf and mixed forests and temperate coniferous forests. This vast Euro-Siberian region is characterized by many shared plant and animal species, and has many affinities with the temperate and boreal regions of the Nearctic realm of North America. Eurasia and North America were often connected by the Bering land bridge, and have very similar mammal and bird fauna, with many Eurasian species having moved into North America, and fewer North American species having moved into Eurasia. Many zoologists consider the Palearctic and Nearctic to be a single Holarctic realm. The Palearctic and Nearctic also share many plant species, which botanists call the Arcto-Tertiary Geoflora.

Mediterranean Basin

The lands bordering the Mediterranean Sea in southern Europe, north Africa, and western Asia are home to the Mediterranean Basin ecoregions, which together constitute the world's largest and most diverse mediterranean climate region of the world, with generally mild, rainy winters and hot, dry summers. The Mediterranean basin's mosaic of Mediterranean forests, woodlands, and scrub are home to 13,000 endemic species. The Mediterranean basin is also one of the world's most endangered biogeographic regions; only 4% of the region's original vegetation remains, and human activities, including overgrazing, deforestation, and conversion of lands for pasture, agriculture, and urbanization, have degraded much of the region. Formerly the region was mostly covered with forests and woodlands, but heavy human use has reduced much of the region to the sclerophyll shrublands known as chaparral, matorral, maquis, or garrigue. Conservation International has designated the Mediterranean basin as one of the world's biodiversity hotspots.

Sahara and Arabian deserts
A great belt of deserts, including the Atlantic coastal desert, Sahara desert, and Arabian desert, separates the Palearctic and Afrotropic ecoregions. This scheme includes these desert ecoregions in the palearctic realm; other biogeographers identify the realm boundary as the transition zone between the desert ecoregions and the Mediterranean basin ecoregions to the north, which places the deserts in the Afrotropic, while others place the boundary through the middle of the desert.

Western and Central Asia
The Caucasus mountains, which run between the Black Sea and the Caspian Sea, are a particularly rich mix of coniferous, broadleaf, and mixed forests, and include the temperate rain forests of the Euxine-Colchic deciduous forests ecoregion.

Central Asia and the Iranian plateau are home to dry steppe grasslands and desert basins, with montane forests, woodlands, and grasslands in the region's high mountains and plateaux. In southern Asia the boundary of the Palearctic is largely altitudinal. The middle altitude foothills of the Himalaya between about 2000–2500 m form the boundary between the Palearctic and Indomalaya ecoregions.

East Asia
China, Korea and Japan are more humid and temperate than adjacent Siberia and Central Asia, and are home to rich temperate coniferous, broadleaf, and mixed forests, which are now mostly limited to mountainous areas, as the densely populated lowlands and river basins have been converted to intensive agricultural and urban use. East Asia was not much affected by glaciation in the ice ages, and retained 96 percent of Pliocene tree genera, while Europe retained only 27 percent. In the subtropical region of southern China and southern edge of the Himalayas, the Palearctic temperate forests transition to the subtropical and tropical forests of Indomalaya, creating a rich and diverse mix of plant and animal species. The mountains of southwest China are also designated as a biodiversity hotspot. In Southeastern Asia, high mountain ranges form tongues of Palearctic flora and fauna in northern Indochina and southern China. Isolated small outposts (sky islands) occur as far south as central Myanmar (on Nat Ma Taung, 3050 m), northernmost Vietnam (on Fan Si Pan, 3140 m) and the high mountains of Taiwan.

Freshwater
The realm contains several important freshwater ecoregions as well, including the heavily developed rivers of Europe, the rivers of Russia, which flow into the Arctic, Baltic, Black, and Caspian seas, Siberia's Lake Baikal, the oldest and deepest lake on the planet, and Japan's ancient Lake Biwa.

Flora and fauna
One bird family, the accentors (Prunellidae), is endemic to the Palearctic region. The Holarctic has four other endemic bird families: the divers or loons (Gaviidae), grouse (Tetraoninae), auks (Alcidae), and waxwings (Bombycillidae).

There are no endemic mammal orders in the region, but several families are endemic: Calomyscidae (mouse-like hamsters), Prolagidae, and Ailuridae (red pandas). Several mammal species originated in the Palearctic and spread to the Nearctic during the Ice Age, including the brown bear (Ursus arctos, known in North America as the grizzly), red deer (Cervus elaphus) in Europe and the closely related elk (Cervus canadensis) in far eastern Siberia, American bison (Bison bison), and reindeer (Rangifer tarandus, known in North America as the caribou).

Megafaunal extinctions
Several large Palearctic animals became extinct from the end of the Pleistocene into historic times, including Irish elk (Megaloceros giganteus), aurochs (Bos primigenius), woolly rhinoceros (Coelodonta antiquitatis), woolly mammoth (Mammuthus primigenius), North African elephant (Loxodonta africana pharaoensis), Chinese elephant (Elephas maximus rubridens), cave bear (Ursus spelaeus), Straight tusked elephant (Palaeoloxodon antiquus) and European lion (Panthera leo europaea).

Palearctic terrestrial ecoregions

References

General references
 Amorosi, T. "Contributions to the zooarchaeology of Iceland: some preliminary notes" in The Anthropology of Iceland (eds. E.P. Durrenberger & G. Pálsson). Iowa City: University of Iowa Press, pp. 203–227, 1989.
 Buckland, P.C., et al. "Holt in Eyjafjasveit, Iceland: a paleoecological study of the impact of Landnám" in Acta Archaeologica 61: pp. 252–271. 1991.
 http://www.Merriam-Webster.com
 http://www.Canadianbiodiversity.mcgill.ca
 http://www.bbc.co.uk/nature/ecozones/Palearctic_ecozone
 Edmund Burke III, "The Transformation of the middle Eastern Environment, 1500 B.C.E.–2000 C.E." in The Environment and World History, ed. Edmund Burke III and Kenneth Pomeranz. Berkeley: University of California Press. 2009, 82–84.

External links

 Avionary 1500 Bird species of the Western and Central Palaearctic in 46 languages
 Map of the ecozones
 http://www.bbc.co.uk/nature/ecozones/Palearctic_ecozone
 https://web.archive.org/web/20150923233335/http://www.economicexpert.com/a/Tigris.htm
 http://www.Merriam-Webster.com
 http://www.Canadianbiodiversity.mcgill.ca

 
Biogeography
.

.
Biogeographic realms

Natural history of Asia
Natural history of Europe
Natural history of Africa
Phytogeography